Brandtjen and Kluge is a US manufacturer of platen foil stamping, embossing & diecutting presses along with modular folder-gluers.  Together John and Henry Brandtjen and the Kluge brothers developed the world's first successful automatic feeder for open platen (Gordon) printing presses (such as those manufactured by Chandler & Price), and in November 1919, Brandtjen & Kluge was formed in St. Paul, Minnesota to manufacture and sell the feeder.  Brandtjen & Kluge is currently located in St. Croix Falls, Wisconsin.

External links
 The Kluge Story

Printing press manufacturers